Oberbilker Markt/Warschauer Straße is an underground station on the Düsseldorf Stadtbahn lines U74, U77 and U79 in Düsseldorf. The station is located at Oberbilker Markt in the district of Oberbilk.

The station was opened on 15 June 2002; it consists of two side-platform with two rail tracks. On the surface, Interchange to Tram line 706 is possible.

External links 

 

Düsseldorf VRR stations
Railway stations in Germany opened in 2002